13 Hours by Air (also known as 20 Hours by Air) is a 1936 drama film made by Paramount Pictures and directed by Mitchell Leisen. The film stars Fred MacMurray and Joan Bennett. The screenplay was written by Kenyon Nicholson and Bogart Rogers, based on story Wild Wings by Rogers and Frank Mitchell Dazey. 13 Hours by Air was also the forerunner of the disaster film, a genre featuring a complex, heavily character-driven ensemble cast, exploring the personal dramas and interactions that develop among the passengers and crew as they deal with a deadly onboard emergency.

Plot
Airline pilot Jack Gordon (Fred MacMurray) on a flight from New York to San Francisco, is immediately attracted to beautiful passenger Felice Rollins (Joan Bennett). Known as a "lady's man", he bets stewardess Vi Johnson (Ruth Donnelly) that he will take Felice out to dinner that evening.  A jewel robbery is in the news and a beautiful blonde is implicated, with Jack suspecting that Felice may be the culprit. On a stop over in Chicago, Jack learns instead that his passenger is a wealthy socialite at odds with another passenger, Count Stephani (Fred Keating). Jack worries that he may have a crisis involving the Count when he finds Stephani has a gun aboard. Other passengers include Dr. Evarts (Brian Donlevy) and Curtis Palmer (Alan Baxter), both of whom seem to be harboring a secret.

Felice is trying to get to San Francisco in order to prevent her sister from marrying the Count's brother, but the flight runs into bad weather. Jack and Freddie Scott (John Howard), his co-pilot, are persuaded to fly on, but are eventually forced to make an emergency landing. Dr. Evarts tells Jack he is a federal agent pursuing Palmer, a notorious criminal. Palmer shoots Freddie and Dr. Everts and hijacks the aircraft. Jack manages to overcome Palmer, and with the help of Felice, is able to take off and fly to San Francisco. When the flight lands, he is able to have his dinner with Felice, collecting his bet, knowing that he will need the money for a marriage licence.

Cast
 
 Fred MacMurray as Jack Gordon
 Joan Bennett as Felice Rollins
 ZaSu Pitts as Miss Harkins
 John Howard as Freddie Scott
 Benny Bartlett as Waldemar Pitt III (as Bennie Bartlett)
 Grace Bradley as Trixie La Brey 
 Alan Baxter as Curtis Palmer
 Brian Donlevy as Dr. Evarts
 Ruth Donnelly as Vi Johnson
 Fred Keating as Count Gregore Stephani

 Adrienne Marden as Ann McKenna
 Dean Jagger as Hap Waller
 Mildred Stone as Ruth Bradford
 Jack Mulhall as Horace Lander
 Clyde Dilson as Fat Richhauser
 Dennis O'Keefe as Baker (as Bud Flannagan)
 Granville Bates as Pop Andrews
 Bruce Warren as Tex Doyle
 Marie Prevost as Waitress in Omaha

Production

Created under the working title 20 Hours by Air, the pace set in 1933 for transcontinental passenger flights, the production updated its name to match the recent exploits of Wiley Post, Jimmy Doolittle, and Roscoe Turner. The picture was filmed at the Alhambra Airport, California, in Cleveland, Ohio, and Beaver Dam, Wisconsin, using United Air Lines Boeing 247 airliners. Second unit filming involved a flight from Newark to Los Angeles to obtain footage to be used in the film. An aircraft assigned to the production was involved in a minor accident.

The pairing of MacMurray and Bennett brought together two dependable leads who worked as Paramount Studios contract players. They were sometimes loaned out to other concerns, and steadily advanced from films like13 Hours by Air to more prestigious fare.

Reception
Film reviewer Frank S. Nugent, in his review for The New York Times, called 13 Hours by Air "pleasant". "... there is no disputing the liveliness of the melodrama. The device of tossing a miscellany of humans and motives together on a bus, plane, train or airliner and letting them work out their destiny is as formular as the Bartender's Guide and has been used as often, but Bogart Rogers's and Frank Mitchell Dazey's story has been screened with a shrewd sense of pace, with a purposeful preservation of suspense and a knack for comic interlude."

13 Hours by Air is part of the EMKA, Ltd. catalog, more than 700 Paramount productions, filmed between 1929 and 1949, that were sold to MCA/Universal in 1958. Destined for television distribution, the Paramount catalog is owned by Universal Television and distributed by sister company Universal Pictures.

References

Notes

Bibliography

 Maltin, Leonard.  Leonard Maltin's Movie Encyclopedia. New York: Dutton, 1994. .

External links

1936 films
1936 crime films
1936 mystery films
American aviation films
Films set on airplanes
American crime films
American disaster films
Films about aviation accidents or incidents
American mystery films
American black-and-white films
Films directed by Mitchell Leisen
Paramount Pictures films
1930s disaster films
1930s English-language films
1930s American films